Volatile suspended solids (VSS) is an analytical parameter representing, loosely, the undissolved organic matter in a water sample. More technically, it a water quality parameter obtained from the loss on ignition of total suspended solids. This ignition generally takes place in an oven at a temperature of 550 °C to 600 °C. It represents the amount of volatile matter present in the undissolved solid fraction of the measured solution.

See also 
 Settleable solids
 Turbidity
 Water pollution
 Water quality

References

External links and further reading 
National Programme on Technology Enhanced Learning
Environmental Business Specialists

Water quality indicators